is a Japanese footballer who plays for Kataller Toyama.

Club statistics
Updated to 27 December 2021.

Honours
 Blaublitz Akita
 J3 League (1): 2020

References

External links
Profile at Shimizu S-Pulse

1985 births
Living people
Association football people from Kanagawa Prefecture
Japanese footballers
J1 League players
J2 League players
J3 League players
Blaublitz Akita players
Shonan Bellmare players
JEF United Chiba players
Fagiano Okayama players
Shimizu S-Pulse players
Fukushima United FC players
Kataller Toyama players
Asian Games medalists in football
Footballers at the 2010 Asian Games
Asian Games gold medalists for Japan
Medalists at the 2010 Asian Games
Association football defenders